Sushma Sharma Ghimire is a Nepalese politician, belonging to the Communist Party of Nepal. In the 2008 Constituent Assembly election she was elected from the Dang-5 constituency, winning 17062 votes.

References

Living people
Communist Party of Nepal (Maoist Centre) politicians
Nepalese atheists
Year of birth missing (living people)
Khas people

Members of the 1st Nepalese Constituent Assembly